Hendra Setiawan (born 25 August 1984) is an Indonesian badminton player. He is an Olympic Games gold medalist, four-time World Champion, two-time Asian Games gold medalist, and two-time All England champion. With these achievements, Setiawan has collected all major individual titles in badminton. He is considered to be one of the greatest men's doubles players in badminton history.

Setiawan was ranked first in the men's doubles with two different partners. Together with Markis Kido, he achieved the world no. 1 in September 2007, and with Mohammad Ahsan in November 2013. He has collected six gold medals at the Southeast Asian Games with the acquisition of 3 in the men's doubles, and 3 in the team event. Teamed-up with Kido, he won the men's doubles titles at the 2005 and 2009 Asian Championships; the 2006 World Cup; the 2007 World Championships; the 2008 Olympic Games; and the 2010 Asian Games.

Setiawan had also played in the mixed doubles discipline, and his best result was in 2010 Indonesia Open, finishing as runner-ups with his partner Anastasia Russkikh from Russia. He made a new strong partnership with Mohammad Ahsan at the end of 2012. They had won numerous prestigious titles including the 2013, 2015 and 2019 World Championships; the gold medal in 2014 Asian Games, winning the All England twice, and winning three times at the BWF Superseries Finals. Setiawan holds the record as the oldest player who won the World Championships title, at the age of 35.

Early life 
Hendra Setiawan was born in Pemalang, Central Java to Ferry Yugianto and Kartika Christyaningrum. He is the youngest of three siblings. Setiawan became interested in badminton when he saw his father playing the sport, and he took up the sport at the age of seven, training at the Sinar Mutiara Tegal club. After graduating from middle school, Setiawan decided to move to Jakarta, train in the Jaya Raya club, and continue his education at the Ragunan Sports School.

Career

2001–2002: Career beginnings 
Setiawan began his international journey at the 2001 Asian Junior Championships, where he won the bronze medals in the boys' team and mixed doubles events. He then claimed the boys' team gold medal in the 2002 Asian Junior Championships, where the Indonesian team beat South Korea in the final. In the individual event, Setiawan was defeated in the semi-finals and won the bronze medals in the boys' doubles with Riyadi, and also in the mixed doubles with Devi Sukma Wijaya. He played at the 2002 World Junior Championships held in Pretoria, South Africa, and  the Indonesia team won the bronze medal after beating Thailand 3–1 in the bronze medal play-off. At the age of seventeen, Setiawan partnered with Joko Riyadi to reach the finals of the 2002 Singapore Satellite, and the duo finished runner-up to Donny Prasetyo and Denny Setiawan.

2003–2005: Southeast Asian and Asian champion 
In 2003, Setiawan made his debut with Markis Kido at the Asian Championships, finishing as runner-up, thus winning a silver medal. He then won his first gold medal with the Indonesian team at the 2003 Southeast Asian Games in Vietnam. Setiawan reached his first IBF Grand Prix finals in the 2004 Denmark Open, but he and Kido were defeated by the home pairing of Lars Paaske and Jonas Rasmussen in straight games.

In 2005, Setiawan and Kido were qualified to compete in the top tournaments, as they had accumulated enough ranking points to do so. They won their first Grand Prix title in the Indonesia Open, beating their senior compatriots Sigit Budiarto and Candra Wijaya in the final. The duo also crowned as Asian Champion after winning the 2005 Asian Badminton Championships held in India. In November–December, Setiawan took part in his second Southeast Asian Games, and won a gold medal in the men's doubles with Kido and a silver in the men's team event.

2006: World Cup title 
Setiawan made his first appearance in the Thomas Cup in 2006. The Indonesian men's team eventually finished 3rd, losing to China in the semi-finals 0–3.  At the 2006 Indonesia Open, ranked 14th in the world, Setiawan and Kido advanced to the final of the 2006 Indonesia Open after beating Jung Jae-sung and Lee Yong-dae of South Korea in the semi-finals. They were unable to defend their title after being defeated by the 2000 Olympic champions, Tony Gunawan and Candra Wijaya in the final. Bouncing back from the loss, they later won their first title of the year in the Hong Kong Open. At the 2006 World Championships, Setiawan and Kido lost in the quarter-finals to England's Robert Blair and Anthony Clark. This was their second loss to Blair and Clark, where earlier in the year they were also beaten in the second round of the All England Open. In October, Setiawan and Kido, then ranked 9th in the world, won the China Open by beating reigning World champions Cai Yun and Fu Haifeng in the final in striaght games. Setiawan and Kido then claimed the 2006 World Cup, beating the Malaysian pairing of Lin Woon Fui and Fairuzizuan Tazari in the final. He competed in the 2006 Asian Games in Doha, Qatar, but lost in the semi-finals of both the men's doubles with Kido and in the men's team, settling for bronze medals in both events.

2007: World champion and world number 1 
Beginning without winning any tournaments in early 2007, in August, Setiawan and Kido won the World Championships title in August, defeating Jung Jae-sung and Lee Yong-dae in the final, 21–19, 21–19 in striaght games. Prior to the World Championships, their best achievement in the first half of 2007 was being the runner-up at the China Masters. After the World Championships, they reached the semi-finals in the Japan Open and won the Chinese Taipei Open. These wins propelled Setiawan and Kido to world number 1 on the BWF World Rankings. Later in 2007, Setiawan and Kido managed to defend their title in the China and Hong Kong Opens. They also reached semi-finals in the Macau and Denmark Opens, but they were defeated by Malaysian pair Koo Kien Keat and Tan Boon Heong in both tournaments. Setiawan and Kido had never won a single match to Koo and Tan since their first meeting in January 2007 at the Malaysia Open, and the head-to-head record between the pairs stood at 0–4. Setiawan then made his third appearance at the Southeast Asian Games in Thailand, and helped Indonesia win the men's team gold. Setiawan then won his second men's doubles gold medal at the Games with Kido, defeating Hendri Saputra and Hendra Wijaya in the final.

2008: Olympic champion 
Setiawan and his partner, Markis Kido, opened the 2008 season by winning the Malaysia Open. Unfortunately, in the following tournaments, they were defeated in the early rounds, namely in the Korea and All England Opens. They then reached the final of the Swiss Open, but lost to Korean pair Jung Jae-sung and Lee Yong-dae in rubber games. Setiawan played at the Thomas Cup held in Jakarta, but he and Indonesia team lost 0–3 in the semi-finals match against South Korea. Later in August, Setiawan and Kido participated in the Beijing Olympics games, managing to make it to the finals. The finals were held on 17 August, the Independence Day of Indonesia. In the final, Setiawan and Kido won the gold medal, beating the home pair of Cai Yun and Fu Haifeng in three games, 12–21, 21–11, 21–16.

After the Olympics, Setiawan and Kido won the next three tournaments in a row, the China Masters, Denmark Open, and the French Open. Their tournament streak came to an end when they lost to arch-rivals Koo Kien Keat and Tan Boon Heong in the quarter-finals of the Hong Kong Open. They then topped the BWF Super Series ranking and qualified to compete at the Super Series Masters Finals held in Kota Kinabalu, Malaysia.They finished in the semi-finals after being defeated by Jung Jae-sung and Lee Yong-dae of South Korea.

2009–2012: Asian Games champion, splitting up with Kido 
Setiawan started the 2009 season as the semi-finalists in the Malaysia Open with his partner Kido who was injured at the time. As the only Indonesian participant in the 2009 Asian Championships held in Suwon, South Korea, Setiawan and Kido managed to win their second Asian Championships title, beating local favorites Ko Sung-hyun and Yoo Yeon-seong in the final. In May, Setiawan competed at the Sudirman Cup in Guangzhou, China. Since Kido still had an injury, Setiawan paired with Mohammad Ahsan in the semi-finals match against South Korea. However, Setiawan and Ahsan lost to Jung Jae-sung and Lee Yong-dae in the tie decider, losing 9–21, 19–21 in striaght games. Indonesia lost to South Korea 1–3 overall. In June, they reached the finals of the Singapore Open and reached the semi-finals of the Indonesia Open. After skipping the 2009 BWF World Championships, Setiawan and Kido won their second title of the year at the Japan Open. Later, they successfully defended their title at the French Open. Despite being ranked second in the BWF Super Series rankings, Setiawan and Kido chose to skip the Super Series Masters Finals to prepare for the upcoming Southeast Asian Games. Setiawan and Kido then won their third men's doubles gold medal at the Southeast Asian Games, and also helped Indonesia to defend their gold medal in the men's team event. Prior to the Southeast Asian Games, Setiawan and Kido had submitted their resignation letters to Badminton Association of Indonesia, and chose to train at their club, Jaya Raya Jakarta.

Setiawan began the 2010 season as an independent player, and competed in the National Championships in January. He and Kido, who also left the national team, won the National Championships title. Setiawan and Kido played at the All England Open, and finished in the semi-finals, their best performance while competing in that tournament at the time. They the nwere called to join the national team training center to compete in the Thomas Cup. Indonesia finished runner-up at that competition after losing to China in the final. While competing in the men's doubles with Kido, Setiawan started a new partnership in the mixed doubles with Anastasia Russkikh of Russia. His debut with Russkikh did not go well, since they were eliminated in the qualifying round of the Singapore Open. He and Kido also lost in the semi-finals to the Chinese Taipei pair of Fang Chieh-min and Lee Sheng-mu. Setiawan and Russkikh then started to gain traction after reaching the finals of the Indonesia Open, but they failed to win the title after being defeated by the Polish pair of Robert Mateusiak and Nadieżda Zięba.

Setiawan finally won his first international title of the year with Kido at the Malaysia Grand Prix Gold. He and his partner, Kido, beating Hendra Aprida Gunawan and Alvent Yulianto in the final. Setiawan and Kido competed at the BWF World Championships in Paris, and won a bronze medal after being defeated by Cai Yun and Fu Haifeng in the semi-finals. At the Europe tour in October–November, Setiawan and Kido finished runner-up at the Denmark Open and semi-finals at the French Open. In the mixed doubles with Russkikh, the duo lost in the first round in Denmark, and in the quarter-finals in France. Setiawan and Kido later won the gold medal in the 2010 Asian Games in Guangzhou, China after beating Koo Kien Keat and Tan Boon Heong. Saving 2 match points in the second set, they won 16–21, 26–24, 21–19, winning their first Asian Games gold. Setiawan and Kido ended the 2010 season as finalists in the Hong Kong Open. This qualified them to compete at the Super Series Finals which would be held in January 2011.

In 2011, Setiawan and his partner, Markis Kido competed at the 2010 BWF Super Series Finals. They were forced to withdraw from the competition after Setiawan sustained knee injuries in a group match. Setiawan then had a title drought in 2011, where he never won any tournaments that year either in the men's doubles with Kido or in the mixed doubles with Russkikh. His best performance at that year was only as semi-finalists in the men's doubles at the Indonesia, Japan and Denmark Open; as well as being semi-finalists in the mixed doubles at the All England Open. Setiawan and Kido then competed at the Southeast Asian Games, helping the Indonesia men's team to defend their gold medal. In the men's doubles event however, Setiawan and Kido failed to defend their title, winning a silver medal after losing to Mohammad Ahsan and Bona Septano in the final. Setiawan-Kido then closed the 2011 season ranked as world number 10.

In 2012, apart from competing with Kido in the men's doubles, Setiawan also played in the mixed doubles with new partner Vita Marissa. Setiawan and Marissa started their debut in Europe tour in February-March, but gave undesiring results after losing in the early rounds at the German, All Angland and Swiss Opens. His best achievements with Marissa were reaching the quarter-finals at the Singapore Open. In men's doubles, Setiawan and Kido clinched the men's doubles title at the Australia and Singapore Open. However, they did not obtain enough points to compete at the 2012 Summer Olympics in London. Setiawan then splitted up with Kido at the end of 2012. Later, Setiawan decided to rejoin the Indonesia national training center, and paired up with a new partner, Mohammad Ahsan, which he had previously been paired with in team competitions and international tournaments. They made their individual event debut at the Denmark Open, and finished as the semi-finalists after being defeated by Shin Baek-cheol and Yoo Yeon-seong of Korea.

2013–2016: Second World Championships, first All England, second Asian Games and third World Championships title 
In 2013, Setiawan and Mohammad Ahsan won their first title as a pair in the Malaysia Open, beating the Korean pair of Ko Sung-hyun and Lee Yong-dae in the final. They later won five tournaments in a row, starting in the Australia Open in April;  the Indonesia and Singapore Opens in June, with another victory against Ko and Lee in both tournaments; the BWF World Championships in August; and later at the Japan Open in September. At the World Championships, they won the title without dropping a single set to their opponents on the way to the final. Their winning streak were then stopped by Ronald Alexander and Selvanus Geh in the quarter-finals of the Indonesia Grand Prix Gold. They then suffered back-to-back losses to Lee yong-dae with his new partner, Yoo Yeon-seong, in the final of the Denmark Open, first round of the China Open, and in the semi-finals of the Hong Kong Open. In December, they clinched the season-ending tournament title, the BWF Superseries Finals, defeating Koreans Kim Gi-jung and Kim Sa-rang in straight games. For their achievements in 2013, Setiawan and Ahsan took the number one position in the BWF world ranking in November 2013.

In March 2014, Setiawan and Ahsan won the All England Open after beating the Japanese paring of Hiroyuki Endo and Kenichi Hayakawa in the final. This was their first All England title for both Setiawan and Ahsan as a pair. Later, they were included in the Indonesian squad at the 2014 Thomas Cup in New Delhi. At the Thomas Cup, Setiawan and Ahsan won their first match against Lee Yong-dae and Yoo Yeon-seong, leading Indonesia to a 3–2 win in the quarter-finals tie against South Korea. Indonesia was then defeated by Malaysia in the semi-finals. Setiawan and Ahsan again lost to Lee and Yoo in the finals of the Japan and Indonesia Opens. They then recorded their second win over the Korean pair Lee and Yoo in the men's doubles final of the 2014 Asian Games, claiming Setiawan's second Asian Games gold. In November, Setiawan and Ahsan won the Hong Kong Open. They later played at an invitational tournament, named "Glory to the King", and won the men's doubles title after beating the home pair of Bodin Isara and Pakkawat Vilailak in the final.

Setiawan and Ahsan won three titles in 2015, the Malaysia Open, BWF World Championships, and at the Dubai World Superseries Finals. They defeated Lee Yong-dae and Yoo Yeon-seong in the final of the Malaysia Open in April. At the Asian Championships, they failed to captured the title, losing to Lee and Yoo in the final in a close rubber game. At the Sudirman Cup, in the semi-final, Setiawan and Ahsan, defeated the four-time World Champions Cai Yun and Fu Haifeng in their opening match, but China took the next 3 matches to win 3–1 in their overall tie. Setiawan and Ahsan then lost in the semi-finals of the Indonesia and Chinese Taipei Opens. The duo then won their second World Championships title as a pair (third for Setiawan), after winning the 2015 BWF World Championships in their home country. They defeated Lee and Yoo in straight games in the semi-finals and in the final, they defeated the Chinese pair of Liu Xiaolong and Qiu Zihan 21–17, 21–14. After the World Championships, they were unable to win a title for the rest for the year, with their best results being semi-finalists at the French Open and Hong Kong Open. Setiawan and Ahsan won their second season-ending title at the Dubai World Superseries Finals after defeating Chai Biao and Hong Wei in the final.

Setiawan opened the 2016 season by winning the Thailand Masters with Mohammad Ahsan. He played at the Asia Team Championships, and led the Indonesia team to the finals. In the finals, Indonesia won the title after beating Japan in the final. Later, Setiawan and Ahsan competed at the Thomas Cup, and the team finished runner-up to Denmark. In August, Setiawan made his second appearance at the Olympic Games by competing in Rio 2016. Partnering with Ahsan as the second seed, the duo were eliminated in the group stage. While competing in 2016 with Ahsan, the pair's performance showed a decline compared to previous years, resulting in the Badminton Association of Indonesia deciding to split up the pair in the end of the 2016 season, each of them focusing on their individual careers with different partners. Setiawan tried to pair up with Rian Agung Saputro and Berry Angriawan, but the pairs did not perform up to standard and failed to deliver results. On 14 November, Setiawan announced his retirement from the national team, and  left the team on 1 December.

2017: Partnership with Tan Boon Heong 
After leaving the national team and playing as an independent player, he partnered up with his former rival, Tan Boon Heong, from Malaysia in 2017. They reached a career-high-rank of 20th on 30th November 2017. The only final the duo made was in the Australian Open, where they lost to Takeshi Kamura and Keigo Sonoda of Japan, 17–21, 19–21. They split up after Setiawan was denied by PBSI of playing together with Tan in the 2018 World Championships.

2018–2019: Regrouping with Ahsan; second All England title and fourth World Championships title 
In 2018, Setiawan rejoined the Indonesia national training squad as an internship player. He first paired with Rian Agung Saputro to compete at the Indonesia Masters, but the duo were defeated by their compatriots Marcus Fernaldi Gideon and Kevin Sanjaya Sukamuljo in the second round. Setiawan and Saputro also played at the 2018 Asia Team Championships, where Indonesia thrashed China 3–1 to retain the title. Later in February, Setiawan reunited with Mohammad Ahsan and played at the India Open, and they were beaten again by Gideon and Sukamuljo in the semi-finals. To collect BWF ranking points, Setiawan and Ahsan participated at the lower-graded Malaysia International Challenge, and emerged victorious after defeating the home pair of Aaron Chia and Soh Wooi Yik in the final. At the 2018 Thomas Cup, the Indonesia men's team failed to win the title after losing out to China 1–3 in the semi-finals. In July, Setiawan and Ahsan won the Singapore Open by beating Ou Xuanyi and Ren Xiangyu of China in the finals. In the rest of 2018 tournaments, Setiawan and Ahsan best results were being semi-finalists in the Denmark, Fuzhou China, and the Hong Kong Opens. The duo qualified to compete at the World Tour Finals, but at that tournament, they were eliminated in the group stage. He and his partner ended the 2018 season ranked as world number 9.

Setiawan and Ahsan were one of the most dominant pairs in the 2019 season, where they entered 11 finals and became the first men's doubles pair to win 3 major titles in a year. Their achievements started at the Indonesia Masters, when the duo finished runner-up to their junior compatriots Gideon and Sukamuljo. The first victory came at the All England Open, when they defeated Malaysia's Aaron Chia and Soh Wooi Yik in the final. This was their second All England title as a pair. They then lost in the finals of the Singapore Open to Takeshi Kamura and Keigo Sonoda of Japan. Setiawan and Ahsan captured their second World Tour title of the year at the New Zealand Open when they beat Japanese pairing of Hiroyuki Endo and Yuta Watanabe in the final in a close rubber game. Setiawan also participated in his fifth Sudirman Cup, and took the bronze medal after Indonesia being defeated by Japan in the semi-finals. In July, they reached two finals, the Indonesia Open and Japan Open, both being runner-ups after losing to Gideon and Sukamuljo in both tournaments. In late August, Setiawan captured his fourth World Championships title. He and Ahsan defeated the up and coming Japanese duo Takuro Hoki and Yugo Kobayashi in the final. The final was held on Setiawan's birthday, making him the oldest player to have won a World Championships title at the age of 35 years and 0 days. These results also took them to move up to second place in the BWF rankings.  Later in the final of the China and Denmark Opens, they became runner-ups again after losing to Gideon and Sukamuljo. Setiawan and Ahsan have never won a match against Gideon and Sukamuljo in the last 5 meetings in 2019. In the final of the Hong Kong Open, they lost to the Korean pair of Choi Sol-gyu and Seo Seung-jae. At the end of the year, Setiawan and Ahsan defeated Hiroyuki Endo and Yuta Watanabe, 24–22, 21–19 in straight games to win the BWF World Tour Finals.

2020–2022: First Thomas Cup title 
Setiawan and his partner, Mohammad Ahsan opened the 2020 season as semi-finalists in the Malaysia Masters. They then reached the finals of the Indonesia Masters, but still were unable to overcome Gideon and Sukamuljo and lost in straight games. At the All England Open, the duo were unable to defend the title after losing in the quarter-finals to Hiroyuki Endo and Yuta Watanabe. In January 2021, Setiawan and Ahsan competed at the 2020 Asian Leg tournament held in Thailand. They first reached the quarter-finals in the Yonex Thailand Open, and then finished as semi-finalists in the Toyota Thailand Open. The duo qualified to play at the BWF World Tour Finals, and reached the final after being able to avenge the defeat to the Korean pair Choi Sol-gyu and Seo Seung-jae from the Yonex Thailand Open, but lost the finals to the Chinese Taipei pair Lee Yang and Wang Chi-lin who previously beat them at the Toyota Thailand Open. In July 2021, Setiawan made his third appearance at the Summer Olympics, at Tokyo 2020. Competing with Mohammad Ahsan as the 2nd seeds, he finished fourth after being defeated by Malaysia's Aaron Chia and Soh Wooi Yik in the bronze medal match. In October, at Aarhus, Denmark, Setiawan finally added the Thomas Cup to his grand list of achievements, where the Indonesian team beat China in the final 3–0, claiming Indonesia's first title in 19 years. Their best results in the rest of 2021 season were reaching the quarter-finals in the French Open and the Hylo Open.

Setiawan and Ahsan began the 2022 season as finalists in the India Open. In March, they stormed into their third All England final, losing to compatriots Muhammad Shohibul Fikri and Bagas Maulana in the final. At the Korea Open, they lost in the semi-finals to Seo Seung-jae and Kang Min-hyuk. They then reached their second final of the year in the Malaysia Masters, but lost to compatriots Fajar Alfian and Muhammad Rian Ardianto in the final in straight games. Later in August, Setiawan and Ahsan entered their fourth BWF World Championships final as a pair. They lost to Malaysia's Aaron Chia and Soh Wooi Yik in straight games, 19–21, 14–21, after initially leading 19–16 in the first game, losing in 40 minutes.

2023 
Setiawan and his partner, Mohammad Ahsan opened the 2023 season at the Malaysia Open, but they were defeated in the quarter-finals round to the Korean pair of Kang Min-hyuk and Seo Seung-jae. In the next tournament the following week, Ahsan and Setiawan lost in  the first round of India Open to the unseeded Chinese pair Liang Weikeng and Wang Chang. After, in their home tournament, Indonesia Masters, Ahsan and Setiawan lost in the second round, losing to fellow Indonesians Leo Rolly Carnando and Daniel Marthin, the eventual champions.

Personal life 
Setiawan has two older sisters Silvia Anggraeni and Ivone Anggraeni. Silvia Anggraeni is married to a former Indonesian badminton player Hendrawan.

Setiawan married Sandiani Arief on 9 October 2011, and the ceremony was held at the JW Marriott Jakarta. His wife gave birth to twin babies named Richard Heinrich Setiawan and Richelle Hillary Setiawan on 19 February 2014. Hendra and his wife welcomed another baby boy named Russell Howard Setiawan on 26 July 2017.

Setiawan also has a personal Youtube channel, where he uploads vlogs with fellow Indonesian players on the World Tour and family vlogs with his wife and kids. His channel has 214,000 subscribers as of November 2022.

Awards and nominations

Achievements

Olympic Games 
Men's doubles

BWF World Championships 
Men's doubles

World Cup 
Men's doubles

Asian Games 
Men's doubles

Asian Championships 
Men's doubles

Southeast Asian Games 
Men's doubles

Asian Junior Championships 
Boys' doubles

Mixed doubles

BWF World Tour (4 titles, 14 runners-up) 
The BWF World Tour, which was announced on 19 March 2017 and implemented in 2018, is a series of elite badminton tournaments sanctioned by the Badminton World Federation (BWF). The BWF World Tour is divided into levels of World Tour Finals, Super 1000, Super 750, Super 500, Super 300, and the BWF Tour Super 100.

Men's doubles

BWF Superseries (18 titles, 10 runners-up) 
The BWF Superseries, which was launched on 14 December 2006 and implemented in 2007, was a series of elite badminton tournaments, sanctioned by the Badminton World Federation (BWF). BWF Superseries levels were Superseries and Superseries Premier. A season of Superseries consisted of twelve tournaments around the world that had been introduced since 2011. Successful players were invited to the Superseries Finals, which were held at the end of each year.

Men's doubles

Mixed doubles

 BWF Superseries Finals tournament
  BWF Superseries Premier tournament
 BWF Superseries tournament

BWF Grand Prix (7 titles, 3 runners-up) 
The BWF Grand Prix had two levels, the Grand Prix and Grand Prix Gold. It was a series of badminton tournaments sanctioned by the Badminton World Federation (BWF) and played between 2007 and 2017. The World Badminton Grand Prix was sanctioned by the International Badminton Federation from 1983 to 2006.

Men's doubles

 BWF Grand Prix Gold tournament
 BWF & IBF Grand Prix tournament

BWF International Challenge/Series/Satellite (1 title, 1 runner-up)
Men's doubles

 BWF International Challenge tournament
 BWF International Series/ Satellite tournament

Performance timeline

National team 
 Junior level

 Senior level
<div style="overflow: auto;">

Individual competitions

Junior level

Boys' doubles

Mixed doubles

Senior level

Men's doubles
<div style="overflow: auto;">

Mixed doubles

Record against selected opponents 
Men's doubles results against World Superseries finalists, World Superseries Finals semifinalists, World Championships semifinalists, and Olympic quarterfinalists paired with:

Mohammad Ahsan

Markis Kido

Notes

References

External links

 
 

1984 births
Living people
20th-century Indonesian people
21st-century Indonesian people
People from Pemalang Regency
Sportspeople from Central Java
Indonesian people of Chinese descent
Indonesian male badminton players
Badminton players at the 2008 Summer Olympics
Badminton players at the 2016 Summer Olympics
Badminton players at the 2020 Summer Olympics
Olympic badminton players of Indonesia
Olympic gold medalists for Indonesia
Olympic medalists in badminton
Medalists at the 2008 Summer Olympics
Badminton players at the 2006 Asian Games
Badminton players at the 2010 Asian Games
Badminton players at the 2014 Asian Games
Asian Games gold medalists for Indonesia
Asian Games bronze medalists for Indonesia
Asian Games medalists in badminton
Medalists at the 2006 Asian Games
Medalists at the 2010 Asian Games
Medalists at the 2014 Asian Games
Competitors at the 2003 Southeast Asian Games
Competitors at the 2005 Southeast Asian Games
Competitors at the 2007 Southeast Asian Games
Competitors at the 2009 Southeast Asian Games
Competitors at the 2011 Southeast Asian Games
Southeast Asian Games gold medalists for Indonesia
Southeast Asian Games silver medalists for Indonesia
Southeast Asian Games medalists in badminton
World No. 1 badminton players